The Abbot of Saddell was the head of the Cistercian monastic community of Saddell Abbey, in Argyll, Scotland. Few abbots are known by name, and although the abbey was founded in 1207, it is not until we hear of his death on 12 July 1393 that Abbot Patrick becomes the first abbot known by name. The following is a list of known abbots:

Patrick, fl. x 1393
Macratius, fl. 1393
Alexander Angussi Goffredi, fl. 1433
Cristin MacOlchallum, fl. 1456
Nigel Machayn, fl. 1456
Alexander Macalexander, fl. 1499

See also
 Saddell Abbey

Bibliography
 Watt, D.E.R. & Shead, N.F. (eds.), The Heads of Religious Houses in Scotland from the 12th to the 16th Centuries, The Scottish Records Society, New Series, Volume 24, (Edinburgh, 2001), pp. 186–7

Cistercian abbots by monastery
Scottish abbots